The Sharing Knife: Beguilement is a fantasy novel by American writer Lois McMaster Bujold, published in 2006. It is the first book in the series The Sharing Knife.

Plot

Fawn, a farmer girl of about 20, has run away from her family, because another farmer has impregnated her and made it clear that he will not acknowledge the baby as his own. Dag, a Lakewalker patroller, first encounters Fawn hiding up in a tree. Later, they meet again, when Dag saves her from some slaves of a malice. Then she assists him in killing the malice, and, in the process, the ground of her unborn child creates a new sharing knife. Eventually, they realize that they are in love, against the customs of both their cultures, and the real story begins.

2006 American novels
Novels by Lois McMaster Bujold
American fantasy novels

HarperCollins books